Niclas Engelin (born 27 December 1972) is a Swedish heavy metal guitarist for Drömriket, Passenger, Engel and The Halo Effect. He previously was the lead guitarist for and Gardenian and the rhythm guitarist for In Flames and has been in and out of In Flames on six occasions.

In 1997, Engelin replaced Glenn Ljungström of In Flames who had just quit. In 1998, Niclas quit In Flames and the band's drummer, Bjorn Gelotte, took over his position as guitarist. Engelin came back to fill in for Jesper Strömblad four times since back in 1998, when he quit. He rejoined In Flames briefly in late 2006 and again in 2009, as Jesper had been struggling with personal issues but maintained he would return. Niclas also toured with In Flames in North and South America, Australia, Europe, South Africa (RAMfest 2012) and portions of Japan in their Taste of Chaos tour.

On 12 February 2010, Jesper quit In Flames, citing a need to face ongoing personal issues. For that reason, Niclas returned as a guitarist, planning to stay until they could find a suitable replacement, but on 28 February 2011, the band decided that he would instead become the full-time guitarist himself.

He formed the band Engel in 2002 with guitarist Marcus Sunesson (The Crown).

In May 2011 Engelin became endorsed by B.C. Rich guitars, using the Warlock Pro X model with gold covered EMG 81 and 60 pickups.
Mr Engelin is since 2012 endorsed by Gibson Guitar Corporation

Drömriket, a project started by Niclas and drummer Magnus "ADDE" Andreasson (Hardcore Superstar), together with vocalist Ralf Gyllenhammar (Mustasch) and Jonas Slättung (bass and vocals), released their self-titled debut album "Drömriket" in May 2014 in Sweden.

In October 2021, it was announced that Niclas would reunite with former In Flames bandmates Jesper, Peter Iwers, and Daniel Svensson, along with Dark Tranquility vocalist Mikael Stanne, in a new project named The Halo Effect.

Discography

With Sarcazm 
 , Shit, ... – 1993 (Deathside Records)

With Gardenian 
 Two Feet Stand – 1997 (Listenable Records)
 Soulburner – 1999 (Nuclear Blast)
 Sindustries – 2000 (Nuclear Blast)

With Passenger 
 In Reverse – 2003 Single (Century Media)
 Passenger – 2003 (Century Media)

With Engel 
 Absolute Design – 2007 (SPV)
 Threnody – 2010 (Trooper Entertainment)
 Blood of Saints – 2012 (Season of Mist)
 Raven Kings – 2014 Gain/Sony

With In Flames 
 Siren Charms – 2014 (Epic/Sony, Razzia)
 Battles – 2016 (Nuclear Blast)
 I, the Mask – 2019 (Nuclear Blast)

With Drömriket 
 Drömriket – 2014 (Gain Records)

With The Halo Effect 
 Days of The Lost – 2022 (Nuclear Blast)

References

External links 

 
 
 

1972 births
Lead guitarists
Living people
Swedish heavy metal guitarists
21st-century guitarists
In Flames members
Passenger (Swedish band) members